Humorous To Bees is a studio album from American folk-rock act Little Tybee released on April 5, 2011 by Paper Garden Records. The album was the group's second full length effort, following their debut 2009 release, Building A Bomb. It featured a slightly altered core lineup from their debut release and the group enlisted the help of nine additional musicians (one of whom subsequently became a full-time member) during the recording process, making this album their most collaborative recording project to date.

The album contains music from several genres. The release of the album garnered a positive response from most, but not all reviewers.

The group released three singles, Passion Seekers, Nero, and History, each with their own music video, to promote the release of the album. They also went on tour in 2011 to promote sales of the album.

Track listing

Personnel
Brock Scott - Vocals, Piano, Acoustic Guitar
Ryan Donald - Electric Bass, Double Bass
Pat Brooks - Drums, Percussion
Josh Martin - Eight-String Electric Guitar
Nirvana Kelly - Violin, Viola
Chris Case - Keyboards
Additional Personnel
Ricky Saucedo - Clarinet
Mario Schambon - Percussion
Colin Agnew - Percussion
Adron Parnassum - Vocals
Ryan Gregory - Violin
Mary Knight - Cello
Nancy Shim - Flute
Greg Hammontree - Trumpet

References

External links
 Little Tybee - Passion Seekers
 Little Tybee - Nero
 Little Tybee - History

2011 albums
Folk rock albums by American artists